Winton may refer to:

Places

Australia
Winton, Queensland, a town
Shire of Winton, Queensland
Winton, Victoria, a town
Winton Motor Raceway in Winton, Victoria

New Zealand
Winton, New Zealand, a town in Southland

United Kingdom
Winton, an archaic name for Winchester, the county city of Hampshire, England
Winton, Cumbria, England, a village and civil parish
Winton, Dorset, a suburb of Bournemouth, England
Winton, East Sussex, England
Winton, Greater Manchester, a small village
Winton, North Yorkshire, a hamlet
Winton House, Pencaitland, East Lothian, the ancient seat of the Earls of Winton
Winton Square, Stoke-on-Trent, Staffordshire, England

United States
Winton, California, a census-designated place
Winton, Minnesota, a city
Winton, North Carolina, a town
Winton, Washington, an unincorporated community
Winton, Wyoming, a ghost town
Winton (Clifford, Virginia), a home on the National Register of Historic Places
Camp Winton, California, a summer camp of the Boy Scouts of America

Outer space
19384 Winton, an asteroid named for Nicholas Winton

Businesses
Winton Engine Company, from 1930 part of General Motors (now Electro-Motive Diesel)
Winton Motor Carriage Company, an American automobile manufacturer from 1896 to 1924
Winton Group, a global investment management and data science company

Education
Winton Academy, a secondary school in Bournemouth, Dorset, England
Winton Community Academy, a secondary school in Andover, Hampshire, England
(Winton), denoting post-nominal letters of a University of Winchester alumni

People
Winton (surname), a surname
Winton W. Marshall (1919-2015), United States Air Force General

See also
Winton Formation, a Cretaceous formation in Queensland, Australia
Winton Professor of the Public Understanding of Risk, University of Cambridge
Winton Manor, a former hotel, now an apartment building in Cleveland, Ohio, United States
De Winton (disambiguation)